Heterogaster urticae, common name nettle ground bug, is a species of true bug in the family Heterogastridae.

Distribution
This species can be found in Africa, Europe, Northern Asia (excluding China), New Zealand and North America.

Description
These shiny bugs show yellow-brown to brown pronotum and corium. Antennae are gray-yellow. The head and pronotum are covered with whitish long erect hairs. These bugs are also characterized by the alternate dark and light markings on the legs and connexivum. Moreover, fore femora are armed with a single spine and the pale tibiae show three dark annulations. The rostrum reaches only to the middle coxae.

Biology
Adults overwinter beneath bark or in hollow woody stem. They emerge in the following spring and mate in June and July. During mating male and females may remain coupled together for 3–4 days. Eggs are laid with a copious secretion in the ground near the host plant. Larvae can be found until September. The new generation is complete from late summer onwards. Adults often forms conspicuous aggregations on nettles. The main hosts plants in Europe are the stinging nettles (Urtica dioica), but the bugs have been also reported on other species of Urtica and on roots of the marram grass (Ammophila arenaria) (Poaceae).

Gallery

References

Lygaeoidea
Articles created by Qbugbot
Insects described in 1775
Taxa named by Johan Christian Fabricius